Lizzie Borden Took an Ax is a 2014 American biographical drama television film about Lizzie Borden, a young American woman tried and acquitted of the August 4, 1892 axe murders of her father and stepmother in Fall River, Massachusetts. It premiered on Lifetime on January 25, 2014 and starred Christina Ricci in the title role. The film was so successful it was followed by a miniseries, The Lizzie Borden Chronicles, which aired from April to May 2015. Ricci has described the film and its follow-up as being "self-aware, campy, and tongue-in-cheek".

Plot
In August 1892, Fall River, Massachusetts Sunday school teacher Lizzie Borden comes across the terrible murder scene of her father Andrew, who had been brutally killed with a hatchet. Local law enforcement arrives, also discovering the body of Abby Borden, the stepmother of Lizzie and her older sister Emma. As the case progresses, the evidence seems to point to Lizzie as the prime suspect. Her lawyer, Andrew Jennings, maintains that a woman could not commit such a cruel and gruesome crime. Still, Lizzie is put on trial for the murders, and the case makes headlines in newspapers throughout the country, which call it the most infamous of the century.

Eventually, the jury finds Lizzie not guilty of all charges. Despite the acquittal, she has become the town pariah. During a final confrontation between Lizzie and Emma, the former asks her sister if she wants to know the truth. Lizzie then whispers into Emma's ear as a series of flashbacks show Lizzie committing the murders. A visibly upset Emma leaves the room, and eventually, moves out of their home, never seeing Lizzie again.  Lizzie walks outside and hears three children jump roping to the famous nursery rhyme: "Lizzie Borden took an axe/She gave her mother forty whacks/When she saw what she had done/She gave her father forty-one."

Cast
 Christina Ricci as Lizzie Borden
 Clea DuVall as Emma Borden
 Billy Campbell as Andrew Jennings
 John Maclaren as Rev. Edwin A. Buck
 Shawn Doyle as Marshal Hilliard
 Andria Wilson as Nance O'Neil
 Sara Botsford as Abby Durfee Borden
 Gregg Henry as Hosea M. Knowlton
 Stephen McHattie as Andrew Borden
 Hannah Anderson as Bridget Sullivan
 Andrea Runge as Alice Russell

Tagline
The teaser trailer featured the time period's popular children's skipping-rope rhyme:

Ratings
In its original January 25, 2014 premiere on the Lifetime network, the film was watched by 4.4 million viewers, making it the night's number-one telecast among all key demographics.

Reception

Series

In October 2014, Lifetime announced plans for an additional limited series based on the film. Originally named Lizzie Borden: The Fall River Chronicles, the series took place after Lizzie's trial. Christina Ricci and Clea DuVall reprised their roles as the Borden sisters. Cole Hauser portrayed Pinkerton detective Charlie Siringo, who investigates other strange occurrences, including murders, centered around the Bordens. Jessy Schram played Lizzie's actress/dancer friend, Nancy O'Keefe, and John Heard played Lizzie's father's business partner, William Almy. The limited series was written by Greg Small, Rich Blaney, Barbara Nance, Jason Grote, and David Simkins. Stephen Kay directed the first two of the episodes, which began airing April 2015.

A teaser trailer aired on December 8, 2014 during the second part of The Red Tent miniseries that was called The Lizzie Borden Chronicles, along with "The series coming in 2015." Despite The Hollywood Reporter stating the series would be a six-hour limited miniseries, on February 5, 2015, it was increased to eight hours.

See also
 Blood Relations
 Fall River Legend
 The Legend of Lizzie Borden
 Lizzie Borden
 Lizzie

References

External links
 
 
 
 
 
 
 

2014 television films
2014 films
American thriller television films
American films based on actual events
Films set in 1892
Films shot in Nova Scotia
Lifetime (TV network) films
Cultural depictions of Lizzie Borden
2010s English-language films
Films directed by Nick Gomez
2010s American films